Avangard Joint-Stock Company is a company based in Saint Petersburg, Russia. It is part of Concern Radio-Electronic Technologies (Rostec group).

Avangard was the leading enterprise of the Soviet Ministry of the Radio Industry, developing and manufacturing high precision special electronic components for communications systems, satellites, and military rockets. Avangard consists of two research institutes and two production plants which develop and produce components for electronics, processing equipment, and instrumentation for the instrument-making industry.

References

External links
 Official website

Electronics companies of Russia
Russian brands
Companies based in Saint Petersburg
Concern Radio-Electronic Technologies
Defence companies of the Soviet Union
Ministry of Radio Industry (Soviet Union)
Electronics companies of the Soviet Union